Kanchenjunga Conservation Area is a protected area in the Himalayas of eastern Nepal that was established in 1997. In the north it adjoins the Qomolangma National Nature Preserve in Tibet, and in the east the Khangchendzonga National Park in Sikkim. To the west it borders the Sankhuwasabha District. It is part of the Sacred Himalayan Landscape, which is being developed by WWF Nepal in partnership with the International Centre for Integrated Mountain Development.

History 
When the Kanchenjunga Conservation Area was designated in March 1997, it was Nepal's third Conservation Area. In April 2003, a Kanchenjunga Conservation Area Management Council was formed with the support of WWF Nepal, comprising seven Conservation Area User Committees, 44 User Groups, and 32 Mother Groups. These community based institutions support effective implementation of all planned activities. In August 2006, the Government of Nepal handed over the management of the Kanchenjunga Conservation Area to the Management Council.

Vegetation 
The landscape of the Kanchenjunga Conservation Area comprises cultivated lands, forests, pastures, rivers, high elevation lakes and glaciers.

Fauna 
Mammal species include the snow leopard, Asian black bear,  and red panda. Bird species symbolic of the area include the golden-breasted fulvetta, snow cock, blood pheasant, and red-billed chough.

This record constitutes the highest known record to date.
Yellow-throated marten has been recorded up to  elevation in alpine meadow.

References

External links

 Department of National Parks and Wildlife Conservation, Nepal: Kanchenjunga Conservation Area

 

Protected areas of Nepal
1997 establishments in Nepal
Wildlife conservation in Nepal